is a Japanese publishing company focused on adult material, such as adult magazines and hentai manga. It also publishes yaoi titles, such as Kirepapa.

Core Magazine owns a bookstore chain .

History 
In July 2002, a special issue of Bubka magazine featured unauthorized childhood photos of several female idols, including Norika Fujiwara, Kyoko Fukada, and Natsumi Abe. A suit was started against Core Magazine for privacy violation.

It 2009 it was the top ero-manga publisher in Japan, with 76 titles, beating Akane Shinsha, which only had 65.

In July 2013, the head editor, Akira Ota, and the two staff members were arrested for having their manga shown partially uncensored. They pled guilty in December 2013 and apologized for their irresponsibility.

In September 2017, Komiflo announced in collaboration with Core Magazine that its titles would be available for streaming. Starting with Hotmilk, this expanded to include MegaStore in 2018.

Magazines published
 
 , a monthly magazine, which replaced  in 2007.
 
 , bakunyū manga magazine
 , a monthly magazine, which replaced  in 2010 
 
 drap, yaoi magazine
 
 
 

 Video games (eroge) magazines
 
 G-type
 Voice-type

See also

 La Satanica—Japanese manga anthology

References

External links
 Official Core Magazine website 

1985 establishments in Japan
Book publishing companies in Tokyo
Comic book publishing companies in Tokyo
Magazine publishing companies in Tokyo
Manga distributors
Publishing companies established in 1985
Hentai companies
Adult magazine publishing companies